Jackson County Comprehensive High School (JCCHS) is located in Jefferson, Georgia, United States. It is one of two high schools in the Jackson County School District. It is fed by West Jackson Middle School.

The school competes in region 8-AAAAAA. JCCHS is known for its academics, band, Army JROTC, FFA, softball, wrestling, tennis, basketball, and football programs.

New school building
On January 31, 2019, Jackson County School District built a new high school building to replace the current building of Jackson County Comprehensive High School, which was scheduled to open in the 2021-2022 school year. Once the new high school facility opens, the current JCCHS campus is to be converted into the Empower College and Career Center, a charter high school that will serve students from the Jackson County School District and the Commerce City School District.

In the news 
On February 14, 2007, at about 8:30 am, freshman Andrew Criswell entered the front office with a homemade bomb. He held two people hostage in the front office, until one of them tricked him into looking the other way as they left through the back. The Georgia Bureau of Investigation, local police authorities, state police authorities, a SWAT team, and bomb squads came to JCCHS. After two hours of negotiations, Crisswell surrendered. The other 1,800 students and 250 faculty and staff evacuated to the Jefferson Civic Center. It was said that Crisswell was trying to make money for a relative's surgery.

On March 29, 2017, an unidentified female teenager called the police to report that a gunman was in the building. This was a hoax and caused the school to be evacuated. The teenager was later identified by police, but not to the public, and was found to be attending East Jackson Comprehensive High School.

Notable alumni
 Brian Bowles - wrestler and professional mixed martial artist, formerly competing in the UFC bantamweight

References

External links
 Jackson County Comprehensive High School
 Jackson County School System

Public high schools in Georgia (U.S. state)
Schools in Jackson County, Georgia